Retinosaurus (meaning "amber lizard") is an extinct genus of scincomorph lizard from the Early Cretaceous of Myanmar. The genus contains a single species, Retinosaurus hkamtiensis, known from a specimen preserved in amber.

Discovery and naming 
The holotype specimen, GRS 29689, was legally obtained from a Myanmar gem dealer in 2019. It was subsequently announced in a preprint in October 2021, and validly described as a new genus and species of lizard by Čerňanský et al. in January 2022.

The fossil was discovered in the Hkamti amber site of Myanmar, which dates to the early Albian, approximately 110 million years ago. The holotype, which represents a juvenile individual, includes a well-preserved articulated skull, partial postcrania, and skin impressions. In addition to the lizard fossil material, the amber also contains several coleopterans.

The generic name, "Retinosaurus", is derived from the Greek words "retine", referring to liquid resins created by trees, and "saurus", meaning "lizard". The specific name, "hkamtiensis", references Hkamti, the type locality.

Classification 
In all but one of the phylogenetic analyses performed by the describing authors, Retinosaurus was recovered as a Pan-xantusiid. Most phylogenies resulted with Retinosaurus as a sister taxon to a clade formed by Tepexisaurus + Xantusiidae. Because the holotype represents an immature individual, the authors explain that any phylogenetic results should be treated with caution.

References 

Scincomorpha
Fossil taxa described in 2022
Cretaceous lizards
Early Cretaceous reptiles of Asia
Fossils of Myanmar